2012 Women's Four Nations Hockey Tournament may refer to:
2012 Women's Four Nations Hockey Tournament (Córdoba), Argentina, 18–22 January
2012 Women's Four Nations Hockey Tournament (Terrassa), Spain, 28 February – 2 March
2012 Women's Four Nations Hockey Tournament (North Harbour), New Zealand, 12–16 April
2012 Women's Four Nations Hockey Tournament (Auckland), New Zealand, 18–22 April